John Morgan Garrett (born March 2, 1965) is an American football coach and former wide receiver. He is the former head football coach at Lafayette College, a position he assumed December 21, 2016 after spending one season as the offensive coordinator for the University of Richmond. He was also a professional American football wide receiver in the National Football League (NFL) for the Cincinnati Bengals and in the World League of American Football (WLAF) for the San Antonio Riders. He played college football at Columbia University and Princeton University.

Early years
Garrett was born in Danville, Pennsylvania. He attended University School in Hunting Valley, Ohio, where he played wide receiver under head coach Cliff Foust. He graduated in 1983.

He accepted a football scholarship from Columbia University in 1983. His father Jim Garrett became the football head coach in 1985. Garrett sat out the 1985 season because of an injury he suffered in the preseason camp, and decided to drop out of college to save a season of football eligibility.

Following his father's resignation after Columbia's 0–10 record, he and his brothers (Jason and Judd) transferred to Princeton University. He sat out the 1986 season to comply with the NCAA transfer rules, while playing on the scout team, which included both of his brothers.

As a senior in 1987, he led the team with 45 receptions for 617 yards and 2 receiving touchdowns. He returned 18 kickoffs for 359 yards and 20 punts for 87 yards. He also began the season as a backup defensive back. He also practiced junior varsity baseball.

In 1988, he graduated from Princeton with a degree in history, with a senior thesis on "The American Football League: Its Rivalry with the National Football League and its Impact on Professional Football".

Professional career
Garrett was signed as an undrafted free agent by the Dallas Cowboys after the 1988 NFL Draft. He was waived after the first preseason game on August 8. He would return home to New Jersey and work as a teacher.

In 1989, he was signed as a free agent by the Cincinnati Bengals. He was released on August 29 and was signed to the developmental squad on September 6. He was promoted to the active roster in December. He appeared in 2 games, while making 2 receptions for 29 yards. He was released on September 3, 1990.

On February 18, 1991, he was selected by the San Antonio Riders in the World League of American Football Draft. He appeared in 10 games, registering 23 receptions (tied for third on the team) for 386 yards (third on the team) and 3 receiving touchdowns (led the team).

On June 12, 1991, he signed as a free agent with the Buffalo Bills. He was cut on August 19. He was later signed to the practice squad, where he remained for a few weeks before being released.

Coaching career
Garrett began his coaching career in 1990 as a volunteer assistant at Princeton University. From 1992 to 1994, he was an assistant in the pro personnel department for the Tampa Bay Buccaneers.

From 1995 to 1998, Garrett served as an offensive assistant for the Cincinnati Bengals under head coaches Dave Shula and Bruce Coslet, working regularly with the wide receivers. In 1999, he became the quarterbacks coach for the Arizona Cardinals, serving in that position for two seasons under head coach Vince Tobin and helping to develop quarterback Jake Plummer. On January 4, 2001, he was named an offensive assistant for the Bengals under head coach Dick LeBeau, working mostly with the tight ends. On February 11, 2002, he was promoted to tight ends coach after Frank Verducci resigned. On February 5, 2003, he became a full-time scout for the team.

In 2004, Garrett was hired as the wide receivers coach at the University of Virginia, where he worked for three seasons under head coach Al Groh. In 2006, he was promoted to the title of assistant head coach for the offense.

In 2007, he was hired by the Dallas Cowboys to be the tight ends coach, working under his brother Jason Garrett. And beginning in 2011, he began to serve as the passing game coordinator. In 2013, he was hired as the wide receivers coach by the Tampa Bay Buccaneers under head coach  Greg Schiano.

In 2014, he was named the offensive coordinator at Oregon State University under head coach Mike Riley. The offense averaged nearly 26 points per game. After the season, Riley left to be the new coach at the University of Nebraska and new head coach Gary Andersen changed the coaching staff. In 2015, Garrett was hired as the offense quality control specialist at the University of Florida under head coach Jim McElwain.

On January 20, 2016, Garrett was named offensive coordinator and quarterbacks coordinator at the University of Richmond under head coach Danny Rocco. The team finished with a 10–4 record and advanced to the NCAA FCS Playoff quarterfinals, while ranking second in the Colonial Athletic Association with an average of 28.6 points and 410 yards of total offense per game. The offense led the conference with 271.5 passing yards per game.

On December 21, 2016, Garrett accepted the position as head football coach at Lafayette College.

Garrett was let go by Lafayette on November 22, 2021.

Personal life
Garrett comes from a family of coaches, his father, Jim, was an assistant coach for the New York Giants (1970–1973), New Orleans Saints (1976–77), and Cleveland Browns (1978–84), head coach of the Houston Texans of the fledgling WFL (1974), and head football coach at Columbia University (1985). From 1987 to 2004, he served as a scout for the Dallas Cowboys.

Garrett's brother, Jason, was formerly the head coach of the Dallas Cowboys, while another brother, Judd, previously worked for the Cowboys in the pro personnel department. A third brother, Jim, is chairman of the English Department at John's alma mater, University School.

With his wife, Honor, Garrett has four children named John Morgan, Honor, Olivia and Caroline.

Head coaching record

References

External links
 Lafayette profile

1965 births
Living people
People from Danville, Pennsylvania
Players of American football from Pennsylvania
Columbia Lions football players
Princeton Tigers football players
Cincinnati Bengals players
San Antonio Riders players
Cincinnati Bengals coaches
Cincinnati Bengals scouts
Arizona Cardinals coaches
Virginia Cavaliers football coaches
Dallas Cowboys coaches
Tampa Bay Buccaneers coaches
Oregon State Beavers football coaches
Richmond Spiders football coaches
Lafayette Leopards football coaches
University School alumni
Garett family